Emirates Foundation is a charity set up by the Government of the Emirate of Abu Dhabi.

Emirates Foundation (EF) was launched in April 2005 as an initiative from General Sheikh Mohammed bin Zayed Al Nahyan, Crown Prince of Abu Dhabi and Deputy Supreme Commander of the Armed Forces. It is chaired by Sheikh Abdullah bin Zayed Al Nahyan, Minister of Foreign Affairs. In 2012, Emirates Foundation was re-launched under the name “Emirates Foundation for Youth Development”, to become an organization focused on a venture philanthropy model.

The foundation makes social investments in youth, through six key programs: Takatof, volunteering progamme; Kafa'at, a youth empowerment program; Sanid, which provides emergency response volunteers; the Financial Literacy program, a program to help youth learn how to manage personal finances and Kayani, a program to develops sustainable social enterprises, providing jobs for youth with disabilities.

The Emirates Foundation also administers the Sheikh Mohammed Bin Zayed Higher Education Grant programme, which has supported 78 Zayed University graduates, who collectively earned 58 Master's Degrees and 15 PhDs from UAE and international universities.

References

2005 establishments in the United Arab Emirates
Foundations based in the United Arab Emirates
Organizations established in 2005
Government agencies of the United Arab Emirates